Madhav Kumar Nepal (born 6 March 1953), is a Nepalese politician and former Prime Minister of Nepal. He served as Prime Minister of Nepal from 25 May 2009 to 6 February 2011 for nearly two years.

He previously served as the Deputy Prime Minister along with the charges of important ministries like Foreign Affairs and Defence in the cabinet of Man Mohan Adhikari. He was previously the executive General Secretary of Communist Party of Nepal (Unified Marxist-Leninist) for 15 years.

Since 18 August 2021, he has been serving as the chairman of the CPN (Unified-Socialist), a new party formed through split in CPN (UML) citing arrogance and monopoly of the party president KP Sharma Oli.

Early life
Madhav Kumar Nepal was born into a Brahmin family to Mangal Kumar and Durgadevi Upadhaya. He graduated in commerce from Tribhuvan University in 1973 and worked in banking and civil service before turning to full-time politics. He has two brothers, Binod Kumar Upadhyaya and Saroj Kumar Upadhyaya and three sisters, Kalika Bhandari, Indira Neupane and Basudha Pokharel.

Political career

Early political activism
Nepal joined the communist movement in 1969 (2026 B.S.). During the underground struggle, he used party names such as 'Subodh', 'Sunil', 'Ranjan' and 'Bibek'. In 1971, he became a district committee member of the Nepal Revolutionary Organisation (Marxist-Leninist). At a conference held in Biratnagar June 7–8, 1975, Nepal was elected as a bureau member of the All Nepal Communist Revolutionary Coordination Committee (Marxist-Leninist). When the ANCRCC (ML) founded the Communist Party of Nepal (Marxist-Leninist) in 1978, Nepal was elected a politburo member of the new party.

Multi-party democracy (1991–2006) 
He was the Deputy Prime Minister in the CPN (UML) minority government in 1994-1995 as well as the leader of the opposition in the National Assembly during the 1990s. He argued for the Nepal Civil War to be solved through talks and did not believe that mobilization of the army was the solution and as the leader of CPN (UML), was one of the three key Nepali leaders, the other two being prime minister Girija Prasad Koirala and rebel Maoist leader Pushpa Kamal Dahal 'Prachanda', crucial in bringing the Maoists into the peace process and signing the 12 point peace accords that ended the decade long war.

Nepal was arrested in 2001 during a crackdown on anti-government protest. Following the palace massacre he called for Prime Minister Girija Prasad Koirala to step down, though later joined forces with him to launch a campaign against King Gyanendra's assumption of executive powers.

Transition period 
On 12 April 2008, Nepal resigned as General Secretary of the CPN (UML), after having lost the  Kathmandu 2 seat to Maoist candidate Jhakku Prasad Subedi in the 2008 Constituent Assembly election. Subedi was a comparatively obscure candidate. Nepal was also defeated in Rautahat-6 constituency by Maoist candidate Devendra Patel. He later won both Kathmandu 2 and Rautahat 1 seats in the Second Constituent Assembly election of 2013. Nepal later chose Rautahat 1. He won the Kathmandu 2 constituency again in the 2017 general election by a margin of 14,000 votes.

In June 2008, the CPN (UML) proposed that Nepal become the country's first President, following the declaration of a republic, though the idea did not materialise after disagreement with the ruling Unified Communist Party of Nepal (Maoist).

Prime Minister of Nepal 

He became the 34th Prime Minister of Nepal on 25 May 2009 after his predecessor Prachanda resigned over a conflict with the president over the dismissal of the army's chief of staff.

Nepal himself resigned as prime minister on 30 June 2010 in an effort to help the government move past its deadlock and to pave the way for a national consensus government, as demanded by the opposition.

Split in Nepal Communist Party and CPN (UML) 
Nepal returned to CPN (UML) after the Supreme court decision to dissolve the party merger between CPN (UML) and CPN (Maoist Centre). Since 18 August 2021, he has been serving as the chairman of the CPN (Unified-Socialist), a new party formed through split in CPN (UML) citing arrogance and monopoly of the party president KP Sharma Oli.

Major Political offices held 
 1990: Member, Constitution Drafting Commission
1991-1999: Member of the National Assembly
1991-1994: Leader of Opposition, National Assembly
1993-2008: General Secretary of the Communist Party of Nepal (UML)
1994-1995: Deputy Prime Minister, Minister of Defence and Minister of Foreign Affairs
1999-2002: Member of the House of Representatives from Rautahat-1
1999-2002: Leader of the Opposition, House of Representatives
 2008-2013: Member of the Constituent Assembly from CPN (UML) party list
 2009-2011: Prime Minister of Nepal
2013-2017: Member of the Legislative Parliament from Kathmandu-2
 2017–2021: Member of the House of Representatives from Kathmandu-2

Personal life
He is married to Gayatri Acharya. He has a son and a daughter, Saurav and Suman Nepal. There have been widespread rumorous claims that he adopted Christianity as his new faith and has been promoting conversion of Hindus to Christianity. However, he publicly and categorically denied any link with Christianity or having any role in expanding the activity of Christian Missionary in his country.

Electoral history

2022 legislative elections 
Nepal is again contesting election from Rautahat. He's facing Ajay Kumar Gupta of CPN(UML) who recently lost as mayor of Gaur Municipality in the 2022 Nepalese local elections.

2017 legislative elections

2013 Constituent Assembly election

2008 Constituent Assembly election

1999 legislative elections

See also 

 2021 split in Nepal Communist Party 
 2021 split in Communist Party of Nepal (Unified Marxist-Leninist)

References

Further reading
Busky, Donald F (2002). Communism in History and Theory. Praeger/Greenwood. 
Hutt, Michael (2004). Himalayan "People's War". C. Hurst & Co Publishers.

External links

Official website of CPN (US)

|-

1953 births
Living people
Nepalese Hindus
Tribhuvan University alumni
People from Rautahat District
Communist Party of Nepal (Unified Socialist) politicians
Bahun
Government ministers of Nepal
Members of the National Assembly (Nepal)
Prime ministers of Nepal
Nepal MPs 2017–2022
Nepal Communist Party (NCP) politicians
Foreign Ministers of Nepal
Nepal MPs 1999–2002
People of the Nepalese Civil War
21st-century prime ministers of Nepal
Nepalese political party founders
Members of the 1st Nepalese Constituent Assembly
Members of the 2nd Nepalese Constituent Assembly
Communist Party of Nepal (Unified Marxist–Leninist) politicians
Nepal MPs 2022–present